Pyramid of Doom is a text adventure game written by Alvin Files and published by Adventure International in 1979. It is the eighth in the Scott Adams' Adventure series. Files independently reverse engineered Adams' Adventure engine, wrote a new game, and submitted it to Adams, who then tweaked it for release as part of the series.

Gameplay 
Gameplay involves moving from location to location, picking up any objects found there, and using them somewhere else to unlock puzzles. Commands are of the form verb and noun, e.g. "Take Shovel". Movement from location to location is limited to North, South, East, West, Up, and Down.

The object of the game is to enter an Egyptian pyramid and plunder its treasures. The player faces a variety of challenges, such as an angry mummy, a purple worm, and an irate desert nomad.

References

External links
Review in Personal Computer World

1979 video games
1970s horror video games
Adventure games
Adventure International games
Apple II games
Atari 8-bit family games
BBC Micro and Acorn Electron games
Commodore PET games
VIC-20 games
Dragon 32 games
TI-99/4A games
TRS-80 games
TRS-80 Color Computer games
Video games based on Egyptian mythology
Video games developed in the United States
Video games set in Egypt